Mecopodinae are a subfamily of bush crickets found in western South America, sub-Saharan Africa, and Asia. In Asia, the distribution includes India, Indochina, Japan, the Philippines, and Malesia to Papua New Guinea and Australasia, including many Pacific islands.

Mecopodinae are characterized by their leaf-like forms, but are sometimes called "the long-legged katydids".  It is a paraphyletic grouping that is part of the Phaneropteroid clade: sister to Phaneropterinae and Pseudophyllinae. Although , Orthoptera Species File places Mecopodinae within the family Tettigoniidae, the family Phaneropteridae has been recommended for reinstatement, with subfamilies Mecopodinae, Pseudophyllinae, Phyllophorinae, and Phaneropterinae.

Tribes and genera
, the Orthoptera Species File lists the following tribes and genera:

Acridoxenini
Auth: Zeuner, 1936 (West Africa)
 Acridoxena White, 1865

Aprosphylini
Auth: Naskrecki, 1994 (southern Africa)
 Aprosphylus Pictet, 1888
 Cedarbergeniana Naskrecki, 1994
 Ewanella Naskrecki, 1994
 Griffiniana Karny, 1910
 Pseudosaga Brancsik, 1898
 Zitsikama Péringuey, 1916

Leproscirtini
Auth: Gorochov, 1988 (equatorial Africa)
 Leproscirtus Karsch, 1891

Mecopodini
Auth: Walker, 1871 (Africa, Asia: India through to Australia)
 Afromecopoda Uvarov, 1940 (west and central Africa)
 Anoedopoda Karsch, 1891 (Africa)
 Arachnacris Giebel, 1861 (Malesia)
 Austromecopoda Rentz, Su & Ueshima, 2006 (Australia)
 Characta Redtenbacher, 1892 (Malesia)
 Eumecopoda Hebard, 1922 (Philippines, Papua New Guinea, Australia)
 Euthypoda Karsch, 1886 (west and central Africa)
 Mecopoda Serville, 1831 (India, China, Korea, Japan, Indochina, Malesia, Melanesia)

Pomatonotini
Auth: Willemse, 1961 (southern Africa)
 Pomatonota Burmeister, 1838

Sexavaini
Auth: Karny, 1924 - central Malesia to Australia (not Sumatra or mainland Asia)
 Biroa Bolívar, 1903
 Gressittiella Willemse, 1961
 Leptophyoides Willemse, 1961
 Paraphrictidea Willemse, 1933
 Phrictaeformia Willemse, 1961
 Phrictaetypus Brunner von Wattenwyl, 1898
 Phrictidea Bolívar, 1911
 Pseudophrictaetypus Willemse, 1961
 Pseudophyllanax Walker, 1869
genus group Mossulae Willemse, 1961
(Java to Papua New Guinea and Pacific islands)
 Albertisiella Griffini, 1908
 Dasyphleps Karsch, 1891
 Diaphlebopsis Karny, 1931
 Diaphlebus Karsch, 1891
 Huona Kuthy, 1910
 Mossula Walker, 1869
 Mossuloides Willemse, 1940
 Neodiaphlebus Kästner, 1934
 Ocica Walker, 1869
 Paradiaphlebopsis Kästner, 1934 
 Paradiaphlebus Bolívar, 1903
 Paramossula Willemse, 1940
genus group Sexavae Karny, 1924
(Australasia to the Philippines)
 Segestes Stål, 1877
 Segestidea Bolívar, 1903
 Sexava Walker, 1870

Tabariini
Auth: Braun, Chamorro Rengifo & Morris, 2009 (South America)
 Encentra Redtenbacher, 1892
 Rhammatopoda Redtenbacher, 1892
 Tabaria Walker, 1870

Tribe unallocated
 Apteroscirtus Karsch, 1891 (Africa)
 Aulocrania Uvarov, 1940 (Sri Lanka)
 Charisoma Bolívar, 1903 (Papua New Guinea)
 Corycoides Uvarov, 1939 (Africa)
 Elumiana Uvarov, 1940 (Congo)
 Gymnoscirtus Karsch, 1891 (east Africa)
 Ityocephala Redtenbacher, 1892 (Pacific islands)
 Kheilia Bolívar, 1898 (Papua New Guinea)
 Pachysmopoda Karsch, 1886 (Socotra)
 Philoscirtus Karsch, 1896 (east Africa)
 Strongyloderus: S. serraticollis Westwood, 1834 (India)
 Vetralla Walker, 1869 (Sri Lanka)
 Zacatula Walker, 1870 (eastern Indonesia)

References

 
Orthoptera subfamilies